Lyubomir Lyubenov (born 26 August 1957) is a Bulgarian sprint canoeist who competed in the late 1970s and early 1980s. At the 1980 Summer Olympics in Moscow, he won a gold in the C-1 1000 m event and a silver in the C-1 500 m event.

Born in Plovdiv, Lyubenov won four medals at the ICF Canoe Sprint World Championships with a gold (C-1 500: 1978), a silver (C-1 1000 m: 1979), and two bronzes (C-1 500 m: 1979, C-2 500 m: 1981).

References

Profile of Lyubomir Lyubenov 

1957 births
Bulgarian male canoeists
Canoeists at the 1980 Summer Olympics
Living people
Olympic canoeists of Bulgaria
Olympic gold medalists for Bulgaria
Olympic silver medalists for Bulgaria
Olympic medalists in canoeing
ICF Canoe Sprint World Championships medalists in Canadian
Medalists at the 1980 Summer Olympics